Unsaturated chondroitin disaccharide hydrolase (UGL, unsaturated glucuronyl hydrolase) is an enzyme with systematic name beta-D-4-deoxy-Delta4-GlcAp-(1->3)-beta-D-GalNAc6S hydrolase. This enzyme catalyses the following chemical reaction

 beta-D-4-deoxy-Delta4-GlcAp-(1->3)-beta-D-GalNAc6S + H2O  5-dehydro-4-deoxy-D-glucuronate + N-acetyl-beta-D-galactosamine-6-O-sulfate

The enzyme releases 4-deoxy-4,5-didehydro D-glucuronic acid or 4-deoxy-4,5-didehydro L-iduronic acid from chondroitin disaccharides, hyaluronan disaccharides and heparin disaccharides.

References

External links 
 

EC 3.2.1